The 1998 Wagner Seahawks football team represented Wagner College in the 1998 NCAA Division I-AA football season as a member of the Northeast Conference (NEC). The Seahawks were led by 18th-year head coach Walt Hameline and played their home games at Wagner College Stadium. Wagner finished the season 7–3 overall and 3–2 in NEC play to tie for second place.

Schedule

References

Wagner
Wagner Seahawks football seasons
Wagner Seahawks football